TrialPay is an alternative e-commerce payment system in which a consumer gets an item for free from a participating merchant in exchange for buying or trying out another product or service from a TrialPay advertiser. The merchant is then paid for the item by the advertiser.  TrialPay refers to this payment model as “Get It Free”.

The company works with online merchants in the software, social applications, casual games, online services, and retail industries, relying "on a web of business relationships to give consumers free goods, as long as they buy something else from a long list of well-known online stores.”

TrialPay's payment platform presents online shoppers with advertising offers as a way to pay for goods or services. Shoppers sign up for a trial or purchase a product from an advertiser to receive a free product. The system tries to provide benefits for each party: online stores make more sales from their current traffic, advertisers acquire new customers on a pay-for-performance basis and shoppers get a free product with every purchase.

Financial Insights analyst Dana Gould says, “This is a [...] unique animal. [S]ince these offers come at exit points, companies are basically saving lost sales.” PC World analyst Yardena Arar, however, noted that the service made her feel like it encouraged people "to get products they don't really need by trying out other products they don't really need." She also found that in some cases the company exaggerated the actual benefits a consumer would receive.

On February 27, 2015, Visa Inc. announced its acquisition of TrialPay. In a press release detailing the acquisition, Visa described TrialPay as, "a simple, cost-effective way to help merchants acquire customers, drive traffic, and increase sales by reaching Visa cardholders with targeted offers." Visa-branded this service the Visa-Commerce Network.

References

External links
 

Electronic funds transfer
Internet properties established in 2006